{{Chembox
| Verifiedfields = changed
| Watchedfields = changed
| verifiedrevid = 470456710
| ImageFile = CHAPS.png
| ImageName = Structural formula of CHAPS detergent
| IUPACName = 3-{Dimethyl[3-(3α,7α,12α-trihydroxy-5β-cholan-24-amido)propyl]azaniumyl}propane-1-sulfonate
| PIN = 3-[Dimethyl(3-{(4R)-4-[(1R,3aS,3bR,4R,5aS,7R,9aS,9bS,11S,11aR)-4,7,11-trihydroxy-9a,11a-dimethylhexadecahydro-1H-cyclopenta[a'']phenanthren-1-yl]pentanamido}propyl)azaniumyl]propane-1-sulfonate
| OtherNames = 3-[(3-Cholamidopropyl)dimethylammonio]-1-propanesulfonate
|Section1=
|Section2=
}}CHAPS is a zwitterionic surfactant used in the laboratory to solubilize biological macromolecules such as proteins. It may be synthesized from cholic acid and is zwitterionic due to its quaternary ammonium and sulfonate groups; it is structurally similar to certain bile acids, such as taurodeoxycholic acid and taurochenodeoxycholic acid. It is used as a non-denaturing detergent in the process of protein purification and is especially useful in purifying membrane proteins, which are often sparingly soluble or insoluble in aqueous solution due to their native hydrophobicity.

CHAPS is an abbreviation for 3-[(3-cholamidopropyl)dimethylammonio]-1-propanes'''ulfonate. A related detergent, called CHAPSO, has the same basic chemical structure with an additional hydroxyl functional group; its full chemical name is 3-[(3-cholamidopropyl)dimethylammonio]-2-hydroxy-1-propanesulfonate. Both detergents have low light absorbance in the ultraviolet region of the electromagnetic spectrum, which is useful for monitoring ongoing chemical reactions or protein-protein binding with UV/Vis spectroscopy.

See also
 Taurodeoxycholic acid
 Taurochenodeoxycholic acid

References

Steroids
Biochemistry methods
Zwitterionic surfactants